Malacothamnus (bushmallow) is a genus of shrubs and subshrubs found throughout much of mainland California and on three of the Channel Islands. Outside of California, Malacothamnus is known from the northern half of Baja California, from a disjunct location in central Arizona, and possibly from a historic location that may have been in southern Arizona or adjacent Mexico.  Plants of this genus are most commonly found in early-successional, post-burn plant communities. Malacothamnus are currently thought to be most closely related to the Iliamnas of the US interior and the Phymosias of Mexico, Central America, and the Caribbean.

Taxonomy
Thirty-seven Malacothamnus taxa have been described, but circumscriptions of many taxa are controversial due to overlapping morphological variation and limited analyses. At one extreme, Thomas Kearney recognized 28 taxa. At the other extreme, David Bates who wrote the 1993 Jepson Manual and the Flora of North America treatments recognized only 11. A more recent researcher of Malacothamnus, Tracey Slotta, recognized 17 taxa, reviving two species and four varieties subsumed by Bates.  Sixteen taxa are currently included in the CNPS Rare Plant Ranking system, with two presumed extinct. Ten of these are not recognized under the Flora of North America treatment and six are not recognized under the most recent Jepson Manual treatment. Further research by Keir Morse is currently in progress to resolve the taxonomy of the genus using both molecular and morphometric approaches.

Species from treatments currently in use
Malacothamnus abbottii – Abbott's bushmallow
Malacothamnus aboriginum – Indian Valley bushmallow
Malacothamnus arcuatus – arcuate bushmallow
Malacothamnus clementinus – San Clemente Island bushmallow
Malacothamnus davidsonii – Davidson's bushmallow
Malacothamnus densiflorus – many-flowered bushmallow, hispid bushmallow
Malacothamnus enigmaticus – enigmatic bushmallow
Malacothamnus fasciculatus – chaparral mallow, mesa bushmallow
Malacothamnus fasciculatus var. catalinensis - Catalina Island bushmallow
Malacothamnus fasciculatus var. fasciculatus - chaparral mallow, mesa bushmallow
Malacothamnus fasciculatus var. laxiflorus - lax-flowered bushmallow
Malacothamnus fasciculatus var. nesioticus - Santa Cruz Island bushmallow
Malacothamnus fasciculatus var. nuttallii - Nuttall's bushmallow
Malacothamnus foliosus – monarch bushmallow
Malacothamnus fremontii – Fremont's bushmallow
Malacothamnus gracilis – slender bushmallow
Malacothamnus hallii – Hall's bushmallow
Malacothamnus helleri – Heller's bushmallow
Malacothamnus involucratus – Carmel Valley bushmallow
Malacothamnus jonesii – Jones' bushmallow
Malacothamnus lucianus – Santa Lucia bushmallow, Arroyo Seco bushmallow
Malacothamnus marrubioides – foothill bushmallow
Malacothamnus mendocinensis – Mendocino bushmallow
Malacothamnus orbiculatus – Tehachapi bushmallow, round-leaved bushmallow
Malacothamnus niveus – San Luis Obispo bushmallow
Malacothamnus palmeri – Cambria bushmallow, Palmer's bushmallow
Malacothamnus parishii – Parish's bushmallow

References

External links
Calflora Query for Malacothamnus
iNaturalist: Bush Mallows - The Genus Malacothamnus
Jepson Manual Treatment of Malacothamnus
Malacothamnus website of researcher Keir Morse
USDA Plants Profile for Malacothamnus

 
Malvaceae genera
Flora of California